Miss World 1956, the 6th edition of the Miss World pageant, was held on 15 October 1956 at the Lyceum Ballroom in London, United Kingdom. 24 contestants competed for title of Miss World. The winner was Petra Schürmann, who represented Germany. She was crowned by Miss World 1955, Susana Duijm of Venezuela.

The announcement of the winner was marked by a moment of confusion. The United States representative, Miss USA 1956 first runner-up Betty Lane Cherry, was given the winner's sash to wear just before the ceremony, and briefly it was reported that she was the winner.  She ultimately was named as the first runner-up, commenting to the press that "two seconds don't make one first".

Results

Contestants

  – Margaret Scherz
  – Madeleine Hotelet
  – Anne Rye Nielsen
  – Norma Dugo
  – Sirpa Helena Koivu
  – Geneviève Solare
  – Petra Schürmann †
  – Iris Alice Kathleen Waller
  – Maria Paraloglou
  – Ans van Pothoven
  – Ágústa Guðmundsdóttir 
  – Amy Kelly 
  – Rina Weiss
  – Angela Portaluri
  – Midoriko Tokura
  – Lydia Marin
  – Jeannette de Montalk
  – Norma Vorster
  – Eva Bränn
  – Yolanda Daetwyler
  – Pascaline Agnes
  – Suna Tekin
  – Betty Lane Cherry
  – Celsa Pieri

Notes

Debuts

Returns
Last competed in 1954:

Withdrawals

References

External links
 Miss World official website

Miss World
1956 in London
1956 beauty pageants
Beauty pageants in the United Kingdom
October 1956 events in the United Kingdom